Ari Ben-Menashe (born 4 December 1951) is an Israeli-Canadian businessman, security consultant, and author. He was previously an employee of Israel's Military Intelligence Directorate from 1977 to 1987, and an arms dealer. He lives in Montreal, Quebec, Canada and runs an international commodity exporting firm, Traeger Resources and Logistics Inc.

In 1989, Ben-Menashe was charged with attempting to sell three military aircraft to Iran in contravention of the U.S. Arms Export Control Act. After nearly a year in jail, he was acquitted.

Biography
Ari Ben-Menashe was born in Tehran, Iran and immigrated to Israel as a teenager. His parents were Iraqi Jews who settled in Tehran in 1945. He  served in the Israel Defense Forces in signals intelligence from 1974 to 1977.

Intelligence career
In 1977, Ben-Menashe joined Israel's Military Intelligence Directorate. He later said, "I happened to be the right guy at the right time. I spoke Persian, Arabic, English. I knew the United States." In his book Profits of War: Inside the Secret U.S.-Israeli Arms Network Ben-Menashe said that following the 1979 Iranian Revolution, his Iranian background provided useful connections, with some of his school friends playing roles in the new government. These connections, Ben-Menashe said, led to his playing an intermediary role in the Israeli effort to sell arms to Iran and were close to the Israeli government decision to back the Reagan campaign's "October Surprise" efforts to ensure American hostages held by Iran and its allies were released on a timetable that strengthened Ronald Reagan and not the incumbent US President, Jimmy Carter.

Ben-Menashe served in the Military Intelligence Directorate until 1987, once under Moshe Hebroni, the deputy to the Directorate's Director, General Yehoshua Sagi. Hebroni told Craig Unger in 1992, "Ben-Menashe served directly under me.... He had access to very, very sensitive material."

In September 1986, Ben-Menashe gave information to Time correspondent Raji Samghabadi about the weapons shipments to Iran organised by Richard Secord, Oliver North and Albert Hakim, which later became known as the Iran–Contra affair. Time was unwilling to publish the allegations, and Ben-Menashe later passed the information to the Lebanese Ash-Shiraa, which published them on 3 November 1986, and soon led to congressional investigations. Samghabadi later said, "The information he gave me was earthshaking, and it was later corroborated by Congress." According to Ben-Menashe, the leaking was done on the orders of Likud's Yitzhak Shamir to embarrass his Labour Party rival, Shimon Peres, whose Labour party had criticized Shamir and Likud for secret activities such as arms operation to Iran.

1989 arrest
In November 1989, he was arrested in the United States for violating the Arms Export Control Act for trying to sell three Lockheed C-130 Hercules transport aircraft to Iran using false end-user certificates. Ben-Menashe claimed that the Israeli government urged him to plead guilty, with officers of Shin Bet visiting his mother in Tel Aviv telling her that "it would be in my best interests to plead guilty to all charges before the Federal Superior Court [in New York] if I wished to avoid prosecution in Israel." According to British intelligence writer Gordon Thomas, while awaiting trial at the Metropolitan Correctional Center in New York, Ben-Menashe was visited by Israeli government lawyers who urged him to plead guilty and promised him that in exchange, he would be granted a generous financial settlement that would allow him to live comfortably after his release from prison. After realizing that Israel was not going to support him, Ben-Menashe began to give interviews to journalists from prison on matters including his role in the October Surprise and its links with the Iran–Contra affair.

Then, Israel sought to discredit him, with efforts including an "authoritative source" telling The Jerusalem Post (27 March 1990) that "the Defence establishment 'never had any contacts with Ari Ben-Menashe and his activities.'" The claims were dropped after Ben-Menashe provided Newsweeks Robert Parry with employment references from Israeli intelligence sources. After almost a year in prison, he was acquitted on 28 November 1990, with a jury accepting that he had acted on behalf of Israel. During his trial, Ben-Menashe's passport was presented as another piece of evidence that he was more than just a low-level Persian translator for the Israeli Defense Forces. The passport documented travel all over the world including Peru, Chile, Guatemala, and multiple points in Asia and Europe. Ben-Menashe's lawyer asked the jury rhetorically, "They need a Persian translator in Chile?" He then stated, "That doesn't make any sense." Former Time correspondent Raji Samghabadi, to whom Ben-Menashe had given details on the Iran–Contra affair before they became public, proved a key defense witness. Samghabadi testified that Ben-Menashe had told him about the US and Israeli arms deals, which would become the foundation of the Iran–Contra Affair, several months before the story broke in the Lebanese newspaper Ash-Shiraa, which indicated that he had high-level inside knowledge of Israeli affairs.

With Ben-Menashe's claims remaining in the public eye, in early 1991 The New Republics Steven Emerson traveled to Israel and, on his return, described Ben-Menashe as merely a "low-level translator" even though the references described Ben-Menashe as working in "key positions" and handling "complex and sensitive assignments." Parry later wrote that other documents confirmed Ben-Menashe's travels: "Ben-Menashe's passports and other documents revealed that he had traveled extensively with frequent trips to Latin America, Eastern Europe, the United States and elsewhere, not exactly the record of the stay-at-home, low-level translator that Israel was trying to sell to me and other journalists." Emerson also published his claims in other outlets, and Newsweek (which Parry had left in June 1990) also attacked Ben-Menashe. In 1992, however, Moshe Hebroni, the deputy director of the Military Intelligence Directorate, told Craig Unger that Ben-Menashe had worked directly with him and had access to sensitive material. Additionally, in the Israeli daily Davar, the reporter Pazit Ravina wrote that "in talks with people who worked with Ben-Menashe, the claim that he had access to highly sensitive intelligence information was confirmed again and again."

Public claims
In 1990 and 1991, Ben-Menashe said that he had been personally involved in Iran in order to assist the Reagan's presidential campaign with its October surprise of preventing the American hostages from being released before the 1980 election. He also gave Seymour Hersh information about Israel's nuclear program, which was published in Hersh's book The Samson Option. Ben-Menashe then fled to Australia and, in his application for refugee status, declared himself a victim of persecution of the Israeli and US governments. For his return to the US in May 1991 to testify to Congress, the journalist Robert Parry received a tip from an intelligence source that the US was planning to divert Ben-Menashe to Israel, where Ben-Menashe feared that he would be charged for revealing official secrets. With a delay to Ben-Menashe's flight, congressional investigators were able to extract assurances from the US government.

In December 1991, Ben-Menashe's appeal against a refusal by Australia to grant him refugee status failed. He left Australia and eventually settled in Canada. 1993 he married a Canadian woman and moved to Montreal; three years later he gained Canadian citizenship.

In 1992, Ben-Menashe published a book about his involvement in the Iran–Contra Affair and intelligence operations on behalf of Israeli intelligence in Profits of War: Inside the Secret U.S.–Israeli Arms Network. Rafi Eitan, Israeli spy and Begin's counter-terrorism advisor, told author Gordon Thomas, who wrote Gideon's Spies, that Eitan had worked with Ben-Menashe on setting up the US–Israeli network for covertly supplying arms to Iran and had collaborated with Ben-Menashe on using Prosecutor's Management Information System (PROMIS) for espionage. Sent a copy of Ben-Menashe's book, Eitan said he had no criticism of it and added that Ben-Menashe "is telling the truth.... That's why they squashed it."

When Robert McFarlane, President Reagan’s national security adviser, sued the book's publisher Sheridan Square Press (founded by William Schaap and Ellen Ray in New York), for libeling him, Sheridan Square lost its financial backers and was forced to shut down.

Robert Maxwell
Ben-Menashe claimed that Robert Maxwell, the owner of Mirror Group newspapers in the United Kingdom, was a Mossad agent and that Maxwell had tipped off the Israeli embassy in 1986 about the Israeli nuclear technician Mordechai Vanunu after Vanunu and a friend approached the Sunday Mirror and The Sunday Times in London with a story about Israel's nuclear capability. Vanunu was subsequently lured by Mossad from London to Rome, kidnapped, returned to Israel, and sentenced to 18 years in jail. According to Ben-Menashe, the Daily Mirrors foreign editor, Nicholas Davies, worked for the Mossad and was involved in the Vanunu affair. No British newspaper would publish the Maxwell allegations because of his litigiousness reputation. However, Ben-Menashe was used as a key source by Pulitzer Prize-winning The New York Times journalist Seymour Hersh for his book about Israel's nuclear weapons, The Samson Option: Israel's Nuclear Arsenal and American Foreign Policy, published in Britain in 1991 by Faber and Faber. Hersh included the allegations about Maxwell, Davies, and Vanunu in the book. Davies's former wife, Janet Fielding, also confirmed in the book that she knew Ben-Menashe was an Israeli intelligence operative and that Menashe and Davies were business partners in an arms company, which was involved in the sale of arms for Israel to Iran during the Iran–Iraq War. When Hersh asked Fielding whether she knew Ben-Menashe was an Israeli intelligence operative, she responded, "It wasn't difficult to put two and two together. Do you think I'm bloody stupid? I shut my ears and walked [out of the marriage with Davies]."

On October 21, 1991, two Members of Parliament, Labour MP George Galloway and Conservative MP Rupert Allason (who writes spy novels under the pseudonym Nigel West) agreed to raise the issue in the House of Commons, which enabled newspapers to claim parliamentary privilege and to report the allegations. Davies was subsequently fired from the Daily Mirror for gross misconduct. Maxwell issued a writ for libel against Faber and Faber as well as Hersh and allegedly told Davies that the Mirror editor had threatened to resign if Davies was not fired but that he would get his job back when the dust settled.

Two weeks later, on November 5, 1991, Maxwell fell from his yacht, the Lady Ghislaine. Ben-Menashe claimed that Maxwell had been assassinated by Mossad for trying to blackmail it.

On November 12, Matthew Evans, the chairman of Faber and Faber, called a press conference in London to say he had evidence that Ben-Menashe was telling the truth about Davies. Evans read out a statement from Hersh, who said he had documentation showing meetings between Davies, unnamed Mossad officers, and "Cindy" (Cheryl Bentov), the woman who lured Vanunu to Rome. Evans and Hersh were later shown to have themselves been the subject of a sting operation by Joe Flynn, Fleet Street's most celebrated con man. Evans had met Flynn in Amsterdam and paid him £1,200 for the forged documents.

October Surprise
Ben-Menashe testified in 1991 that he had personally witnessed George HW Bush attend a meeting with members of the Iranian government in Paris in October 1980, as part of a covert Republican Party operation to have the 52 U.S hostages held in Iran remain there until President Jimmy Carter, who was negotiating their release, had lost the 1980 presidential election to Ronald Reagan. Time called him a "spinner of tangled yarns," and ABC News claimed he failed a lie-detector test: on a scale of reliability from zero to minus eight, he scored minus eight or minus seven on major questions. In 1992, the American journalist Craig Unger of The Village Voice wrote: "Ari has put five or six dozen journalists from all over the world through roughly the same paces. His seduction begins with a display of his mastery of the trade craft of the legendary Israeli intelligence services. A roll of quarters handy for furtive phone calls, he navigates the back channels that tie the spooks at Langley to their counterparts in Tel Aviv. His astute analysis and mind-boggling revelations can stir even the most jaded old hand of the Middle East.... Listen to him, trust him, print his story verbatim—then sit round and watch your career go up in flames."

In its report published January 3, 1993, the House October Surprise Task Force investigating the "October surprise" allegations stated, "Ben-Menashe's testimony is impeached by documents and is riddled with inconsistencies and factual misstatements which undermine his credibility. Based on the documentary evidence available, the Task Force has determined that Ben-Menashe's account of the October meetings, like his other October Surprise allegations, is a total fabrication."

Business career

Personal and business controversies
Ben-Menashe moved to Sydney, Australia, in 1992, then to Montreal, Quebec, Canada, where he married a Canadian woman and became a citizen. He was arrested in 2002 during acrimonious divorce proceedings and charged with assault, following complaints by his wife and mother-in-law, but he was subsequently acquitted. He set up Carlington Sales Canada Corporation, which was accused of taking payments for shipments of grain that allegedly never materialized, according to Canada's National Post (July 25, 2005). Ben-Menashe's American business partner, Alexander Legault, was arrested in October 2008 while he was being deported back into the United States after a failed refugee claim in Canada. He had been wanted on $10,000,000 bond by the FBI since 1986 on charges of racketeering, conspiracy, organized fraud, mail fraud, and unregulated security in Florida and Louisiana.

Documents obtained in 2002 by Canadian journalists under Canada's freedom of information legislation show that Ben-Menashe had a relationship with the Canadian government: "over 400 pages showing Ben-Menashe was regularly de-briefed by Canadian intelligence officers, plumbed about what he knew of the inner workings of the governments he was involved with."

Zimbabwe 
Ben-Menashe again came to the attention of the international media in 2002, when he alleged that Morgan Tsvangirai, the leader of Zimbabwe's opposition party, the Movement for Democratic Change, had asked him to help "eliminate" President Robert Mugabe. Ben-Menashe produced a videotape of conversations between himself and Tsvangirai in London, England, and Montreal, where the latter appeared to ask for Ben-Menashe's help as a political consultant. Unknown to Tsvangirai, Ben-Menashe's Montreal consultancy firm at the time, Dickens and Madson, was working for Mugabe, and tapes of the ambiguous conversation were passed to the Zimbabwean authorities, which charged Tsvangirai with treason, which is punishable by death in that country.

Tsvangirai was put on trial for treason before the Harare High Court but was exonerated in October 2004 after the judge accepted he had not used the word "eliminate" to mean that he wanted Mugabe to be assassinated. Judge Paddington Garwe described Ben-Menashe, who was the prosecution's star witness, as "rude, unreliable, and contemptuous."

Ben-Menashe was hired by Paul Le Roux, an international drug lord and DEA informant born in the former Rhodesia to lobby the Zimbabwe government to grant leases to Zimbabwean farmlands. The lands would then be subleased to white farmers dislodged by previous land reform in Zimbabwe. Ben-Menashe received more than US$14 million from Le-Roux.

Soybeans 
In June 2005, Alexander Vassiliev of Sonox International, a Florida-based food export company, told the National Post that he had wired a deposit of US$336,000 to Ben-Menashe's former company, Albury Grain Sales, which undertook to ship 12,000 tonnes of soybeans from North America to a Sonox agent in Uzbekistan. Vassiliev alleged that the soybeans did not arrive. The case went to court and was dismissed and then referred to arbitration, where it was again dismissed. Alexander Vassiliev said that he simply ran out of money for lawyers versus Ben-Menashe riding on deposit he received and that it looks like Ben-Menashe's "modus operandi" in every business deals.

Firebombing
In December 2012, Ben-Menashe's lavish home in Montreal was badly damaged by a firebomb. According to the National Post, Ben-Menashe suggested, "Someone had been out to get him."

Sudan
Ben-Menashe's Montreal based lobbying firm was hired by Sudanese General Mohamed Hamdan Dagalo in a $6 million deal. The firm, Dickens & Madson Inc, signed a deal offering to seek government recognition, funding, and "striving to obtain funding and equipment for the Sudanese military" with General Dagalo. Dagalo's forces carried out the Khartoum massacre in which more than 100 protesters were killed.

Myanmar
He was also hired by Tatmadaw  the military junta ruling Myanmar following the 2021 Myanmar coup d'état  pushing unverified claims that the goal of the coup was to move Myanmar out of China's orbit in an attempt to rebrand the globally condemned regime.

Publications
Ari Ben-Menashe: Profits of War: Inside the Secret U.S.-Israeli Arms Network, New York, Sheridan Square Press 1992 (USA) . (First published 23 October 1992 by Allen & Unwin Australia Pty Ltd)

References

Further reading
"Journalist defends Tsvangirai tape", CNN, February 26, 2002.
"Harry Martin and Propaganda Techniques", Political Research Associates, undated.
Ben-Menashe strikes again, The Review, Australia/Israel and Jewish Affairs Council, March 2002.
Joint report of the Task Force to Investigate Certain Allegations Concerning the Holding of American Hostages by Iran in 1980 ("October Surprise Task Force"), US GPO, 1993, pp 97–99
Cohen, Julie: "Who Will Unwrap the October Surprise?", Columbia Journalism Review, September 1991.
Danby, Michael: "Of Liars and Lives", The Review, Australia/Israel and Jewish Affairs Council, April 2003
Davies, Nick: The Unknown Maxwell - his astonishing secret lives revealed by his aide and close companion. Sidgwick & Jackson, 1992. 
Harris, Paul; Burke, Jason: "Mugabe men's blood gems", The Observer, March 3, 2002.
Hersh, Seymour:  The Samson Option: Israel's Nuclear Arsenal and American Foreign Policy, 1991.
Hutchinson, Brian; Hamilton, Graeme: "Montreal's 'man of infamy'", National Post, June 25, 2005.
Mallo, Sean: Fact or fiction? The claims of Ari Ben-Menashe, The Green Left Weekly, February 5, 1992.
Unger, Craig: "The trouble with Ari," The Village Voice, July 1992.
Unger, Craig: Saving the Saudis, Vanity Fair, October 1, 2003.
Weinberg, Steve : , Columbia Journalism Review, March 1992.

Living people
Businesspeople from Tehran
1951 births
Iranian Jews
Iranian emigrants to Israel
Israeli Jews
Historians of espionage
Israeli non-fiction writers
Israeli emigrants to Canada
Naturalized citizens of Canada
Jewish Canadian writers
Canadian businesspeople